Manuel Paso (1864–1901) was a Spanish poet and playwright.

Born in Granada, he was the lesser-known of the five Spanish so-called “autores premodernistas” (pre-Modernist poetry) Manuel Reina, Salvador Rueda, Ricardo Gil, and Carlos Fernández Shaw.

He worked for the magazines Germinal and La Democracia Social and his poems were also published in Los Madriles.

Paso died of tuberculosis at the age of 35.

Publications
1886: Nieblas

Drama
1898: Curro Vargas (with Joaquín Dicenta and music by Ruperto Chapí)
1900: La Cortijera (with Joaquín Dicenta and music by Ruperto Chapí)

References

Bibliography
A. W. Phillips "En torno a la poesía de Manuel Paso, olvidado escritor granadino" in L. T. González del Valle, D. Villanueva, Ed. Estudios en honor a Ricardo Gullón, Nebraska, pp. 263–278

1864 births
1901 deaths
Spanish male dramatists and playwrights
19th-century Spanish poets
Spanish male poets
19th-century Spanish dramatists and playwrights
19th-century male writers